Zythos aphrodite is a moth of the family Geometridae described by Louis Beethoven Prout in 1932. It is found in New Guinea and Australia.

Subspecies
Zythos aphrodite aphrodite
Zythos aphrodite rooki (Prout, 1938) (Rook Island)

References

Moths described in 1932
Scopulini